The 3rd Houston Film Critics Society Awards nominations were announced on the December 17, 2009. The 2009 awards were given out at a ceremony held at the Museum of Fine Arts on December 19, 2009. The awards are presented annually by the Houston Film Critics Society based in Houston, Texas.

Winners and nominees
Winners are listed first and highlighted with boldface

References

External links
 Houston Film Critics Society: Awards

2009
2009 film awards
2009 in Texas
Houston